Silent Night is a 2012 slasher film directed by Steven C. Miller and starring Malcolm McDowell, Jaime King, Donal Logue, Ellen Wong, and Brendan Fehr. It is a reboot of the Silent Night, Deadly Night film series and its sixth installment. The film was given a limited theatrical release on November 30, 2012, and was released on DVD and Blu-ray Disc on December 4, 2012.

Plot 
A mysterious man dresses in a Santa Claus suit, complete with a mask. Once dressed, "Santa" captures and kills Jordan (Brendan Fehr), a deputy sheriff, in the small town of Cryer, Wisconsin. Jordan is sleeping with the married Alana Roach (Ali Tartaryn) and is electrocuted with Christmas lights in his home. The following day, Christmas Eve, Cryer Sheriff Cooper (Malcolm McDowell), calls Deputy Aubrey Bradimore (Jaime King) in on her day off when Jordan doesn't arrive at work. Aubrey is a new addition to the sheriff's office and is still reeling from the unexpected death of her husband John. She doesn't think she's a good deputy, as she is trying to live up to her father, who is a retired sheriff. Aubrey was going to spend the holiday with her parents, but instead goes out to check on Jordan, finding his mangled body, and Roach, who has been dismembered, later in the day. Sheriff Cooper decides not to tell Mayor Revie (Tom Anniko) until the case is solved.

Meanwhile, the masked Santa killer goes on a murder spree, killing those who have done something he considers 'naughty.' His next victim is a bratty teenage girl who he kills with a cattle prod. He then makes his way to the local motel, murdering two of three people during a softcore porn shoot. One woman manages to escape and tries to hide inside a Christmas tree farm, but the killer chops off one of her legs and throws her feet-first into a woodchipper. Sheriff Cooper calls in Deputy Stanley Giles (Andrew Cecon) and goes out to find the killer himself, but comes back empty-handed. Aubrey starts to suspect Santa Jim Epstein (Donal Logue), a local drunken Santa portrayer, drug dealer Stein Karsson (Mike O’Brien), and the perverted Reverend Madely (Curtis Moore).

Aubrey attempts to interrogate Karsson, but he flees. Aubrey gives chase, and she is nearly killed but is narrowly saved by Sheriff Cooper. That evening, during the town's annual Christmas parade, Aubrey searches for the killer but is unable to identify him among a crowd of men dressed in Santa Claus suits, though she arrests Jim when he flees from her. The killer Santa continues on his spree, arriving at the church and kills Reverend Madely. He murders Mayor Revie, his porn star daughter Tiffany (Courtney-Jane White), and her boyfriend Dennis (Erik J. Berg). Aubrey goes to Karsson's motel room to arrest him, and is forced to kill him when he draws a gun.

Aubrey notices a gift box that contains a piece of coal, and recalls that both the station and her father had received the same gift. Aubrey arrives at her parents' home, only to find her father dead and her mother hiding in the closet. Meanwhile, the killer attacks the station, killing Cooper, Giles, and Jim. Aubrey, along with the station secretary Brenda (Ellen Wong), are cornered by the killer inside the police station, where the killer tries to burn down the place with a homemade flamethrower. Aubrey is able to overpower the killer Santa and sets him on fire, but in the end he manages to escape.

It is later revealed that the killer Santa is Ronald Jones, Jr., owner of a local chimney cleaning and repair service, and he survived the flamethrower attack. During the hunt for the killer, Aubrey learns from another Santa portrayer that Ronald Sr. had crashed his ex-wife's Christmas party many years ago, burning her alive with the homemade flamethrower. Aubrey's father was the deputy that responded to the situation and gunned him down, only to find out that Ronald Jr. was in his father's truck watching the entire time. The tragedy caused Ronald Jr. to go insane and seek revenge, dressing as Santa so he would not get caught during Cryer's Christmas festivities.

Cast

Production

Development 
The idea to reboot the Silent Night, Deadly Night series came in 2006. After a screening of the first film, Scott Schneid, who co-created it, suggested the idea of a remake to Ryan Heppe, who worked at David Foster Productions as a development executive. Heppe convinced Foster to announce that there would be a remake.

Screenwriter Jayson Rothwell had not watched the original Silent Night, Deadly Night, so instead he was asked to write based on his own ideas of what a Christmas-themed horror movie was. Rothwell chose to base the film on the Covina Massacre— on Christmas Eve in 2008, Bruce Jeffrey Pardo opened fire at a Christmas party at his ex-wife’s house and burned the house down, killing multiple people, including himself. He wore a Santa outfit during the attack.

Release 
Distributed by Anchor Bay, the film was released in theaters for a limited run in select U.S. cities on November 30, 2012, showing in 11 theaters. It grossed  $14,567 in the United States. Internationally, the film grossed $100,065, making for a worldwide gross of $114,633. It was released on DVD and Blu-ray on December 4.

Reception 
The film received mixed to positive reviews from critics. Rotten Tomatoes gives the film an approval rating of 64%, based on 11 reviews, with a rating average of 5.83/10. Metacritic, which assigns a weighted average score based on reviews from mainstream critics, awarded the film an average score of 53 out of 100 based on 4 reviews, indicating "mixed or average reviews".

The Los Angeles Times wrote that "The movie's intended audience will likely be satisfied by its parade of gory mayhem, cheap thrills and groan-worthy dark humor. Everyone else: You're on your own" while The Hollywood Reporter called the film a "cinematic lump of coal" and a "formulaic effort". Variety felt that the film was "a singularly glum and dumb enterprise" and concluded "apart from some modestly inventive carnage and an undeniably humorous hambone turn by Malcolm McDowell, there's really nothing here to make genre fans dash through the snow".

Silent Night was met with mostly positive reception from several horror film sites, such as Slasher Studios ("It might not be everyone's cup of egg nog but for what it's worth it is definitely worth a look") and Oh, The Horror! ("it's one of the better recent remakes"). Bloody Disgusting gave a score of three and a half out of five, writing "While Silent Night does not add anything new to the subgenre, it delivers the ho ho horror with its spectacular kills and tongue-in-cheek humor. This is a fun film that is bound to spread some holiday cheer in the hearts of slasher fans" and Fearnet stated "this straightforward and scrappy little remake is somehow more entertaining than half of what passes for "wide release" horror movies these days. Toss in some fine cinematography, some cool musical touches, and just enough "in jokes" to keep the hardcore horror fans happy, Silent Night certainly isn't great, but it is consistently fun, and that's more than enough—especially for a horror remake". Christopher Safranski of Dread Central stated Silent Night “is one case that I think breaks the standard rule” of originals being superior to remakes because “What makes the remake work is its ability to balance horror and comedy very well”.

Soundtrack 

Silent Night (Original Motion Picture Soundtrack) is the soundtrack album for the movie, released on November 25, 2012 under the record label Pale Blue Records. The music was composed by Kevin Riepl.

Track listing

References

External links 

 
 
 
 

2012 films
2012 horror films
2012 independent films
2010s serial killer films
2010s slasher films
2010s Christmas horror films
American Christmas horror films
American independent films
American mystery thriller films
American serial killer films
American slasher films
American mystery horror films
English-language Canadian films
Canadian Christmas horror films
Canadian horror films
Canadian mystery thriller films
Canadian serial killer films
Canadian slasher films
Canadian thriller films
Slasher comedy films
Adultery in films
Films set in 2013
Remakes of American films
Horror film remakes
Santa Claus in film
2010s English-language films
Films set in Wisconsin
Films shot in Winnipeg
Silent Night, Deadly Night films
Films directed by Steven C. Miller
Canadian comedy horror films
2010s Canadian films
2010s American films